Kateřina Burianová (born 30 March 1946) is a Czech actress. She won the Alfréd Radok Award for Best Actress in 2009 for her role of Violet Weston in the play August: Osage County at the Estates Theatre in Prague. At the 2009 Thalia Awards she won the category of Best Actress in a Play for the same work.

References

External links

1946 births
Living people
Actresses from Prague
Czech television actresses
Czech stage actresses
20th-century Czech actresses
21st-century Czech actresses
Recipients of the Thalia Award